Jan Masureel (born 6 September 1981 in Bruges) is a Belgian professional football player.

Masureel started his career at Cercle Brugge, where he made his debut for the first team in 2001, in a 2–0 home win against FC Denderleeuw. In 2006, Masureel was loaned for a whole season to SK Deinze in the Belgian Second Division, where he scored 8 goals, despite having played as full-back all the time. On 22 June 2007, it was revealed that Masureel's transfer to KV Oostende had been completed. After one season in Oostende, he moved to K.V. Red Star Waasland, with which he enjoyed promotion to the Belgian Pro League during the 2011–12 season. He moved to Deinze after the promotion.

References

 Jan Masureel player info at the official KMSK Deinze website 
 Cerclemuseum.be 

Living people
1981 births
Belgian footballers
Cercle Brugge K.S.V. players
K.V. Oostende players
S.K. Beveren players
Association football defenders
Footballers from Bruges
Belgian Pro League players
Challenger Pro League players
K.M.S.K. Deinze players
Association football midfielders